The University of Warwick (abbreviated as Warw. in post-nominal letters) is a public research university on the outskirts of Coventry between the West Midlands and Warwickshire, England. The university was founded in 1965 as part of a government initiative to expand higher education. The Warwick Business School was established in 1967, the Warwick Law School in 1968, Warwick Manufacturing Group (WMG) in 1980, and Warwick Medical School in 2000. Warwick incorporated Coventry College of Education in 1979 and Horticulture Research International in 2004.

Warwick is primarily based on a  campus on the outskirts of Coventry, with a satellite campus in Wellesbourne and a central London base at the Shard. It is organised into three faculties—Arts, Science Engineering and Medicine, and Social Sciences—within which there are 32 departments. As of 2021, Warwick has around 29,534 full-time students and 2,691 academic and research staff, with an average intake of 4,950 undergraduates out of 38,071 applicants (7.7 applicants per place). The annual income of the institution for 2021–22 was £770.6 million of which £139.9 million was from research grants and contracts, with an expenditure of £860.8 million. Warwick Arts Centre is a multi-venue arts complex in the university's main campus and is the largest venue of its kind in the UK, which is not in London.

Warwick is a member of AACSB, the Association of Commonwealth Universities, the Association of MBAs, EQUIS, the European University Association, the Midlands Innovation group, the Russell Group, Sutton 13 and Universities UK. It is the only European member of the Center for Urban Science and Progress, a collaboration with New York University. The university has extensive commercial activities, including the University of Warwick Science Park and WMG, University of Warwick.

Warwick's alumni and staff include winners of the Nobel Prize, Turing Award, Fields Medal, Richard W. Hamming Medal, Emmy Award, Grammy, and the Padma Vibhushan, and are fellows to the British Academy, the Royal Society of Literature, the Royal Academy of Engineering, and the Royal Society. Alumni also include heads of state, government officials, leaders in intergovernmental organisations, and a former chief economist at the Bank of England. Researchers at Warwick have also made significant contributions such as the development of penicillin, music therapy, the Washington Consensus, second-wave feminism, computing standards, including ISO and ECMA, complexity theory, contract theory, and the International Political Economy as a field of study.

History

Twentieth century

The idea for a university in Warwickshire was first mooted shortly after World War II, although it was not founded for a further two decades. A partnership of the city and county councils ultimately provided the impetus for the university to be established on a  site jointly granted by the two authorities. There was some discussion between local sponsors from both the city and county over whether it should be named after Coventry or Warwickshire. The establishment of the University of Warwick was given approval by the government in 1961 and it received its Royal Charter of Incorporation in 1965. Since then, the university has incorporated the former Coventry College of Education in 1979 and has extended its land holdings by the continuing purchase of adjoining farm land. The university also benefited from a substantial donation from the family of John 'Jack' Martin, a Coventry businessman who had made a fortune from investment in Smirnoff vodka, and which enabled the construction of the Warwick Arts Centre.

The university admitted its first, small intake of graduate students in 1964, and took its first 450 undergraduates in October 1965. In the 1960s and 1970s, Warwick had a reputation as a politically radical institution.

Under Vice-Chancellor Lord Butterworth, Warwick was the first UK university to adopt a business approach to higher education, develop close links with the business community and exploit the commercial value of its research. These tendencies were discussed by British historian and then-Warwick lecturer, E. P. Thompson, in his 1970 edited book Warwick University Ltd..

The Leicester Warwick Medical School, a new medical school based jointly at Warwick and Leicester University, opened in September 2000.

On the recommendation of then-Prime Minister Tony Blair, Bill Clinton chose Warwick as the venue for his last major foreign policy address as US President in December 2000. Sandy Berger, Clinton's National Security Advisor, explaining the decision in a press briefing on 7 December 2000, said that: "Warwick is one of Britain's newest and finest research universities, singled out by Prime Minister Blair as a model both of academic excellence and independence from the government."

Twenty-first century
The university was seen as a favoured institution of the Labour government during the New Labour years (1997 to 2010). It was academic partner for a number of flagship Government schemes including the National Academy for Gifted and Talented Youth and the NHS University (now defunct). Tony Blair described Warwick as "a beacon among British universities for its dynamism, quality and entrepreneurial zeal". In a 2012 study by Virgin Media Business, Warwick was described as the most "digitally-savvy" UK university.

In February 2001, IBM donated a new S/390 computer and software worth £2 million to Warwick, to form part of a "Grid" enabling users to remotely share computing power. In April 2004 Warwick merged with the Wellesbourne and Kirton sites of Horticulture Research International. In July 2004 Warwick was the location for an important agreement between the Labour Party and the trade unions on Labour policy and trade union law, which has subsequently become known as the "Warwick Agreement".

In June 2006 the new University Hospital Coventry opened, including a  university clinical sciences building. Warwick Medical School was granted independent degree-awarding status in 2007, and the School's partnership with the University of Leicester was dissolved in the same year. In February 2010, Lord Bhattacharyya, director and founder of the WMG unit at Warwick, made a £1 million donation to the university to support science grants and awards.

In February 2012 Warwick and Melbourne-based Monash University announced the formation of a strategic partnership, including the creation of 10 joint senior academic posts, new dual master's and joint doctoral degrees, and co-ordination of research programmes. In March 2012 Warwick and Queen Mary, University of London announced the creation of a strategic partnership, including research collaboration, some joint teaching of English, history and computer science undergraduates, and the creation of eight joint post-doctoral research fellowships.  

In April 2012 it was announced that Warwick would be the only European university participating in the Center for Urban Science and Progress, an applied science research institute to be based in New York consisting of an international consortium of universities and technology companies led by New York University and NYU-Poly. In August 2012, Warwick and five other Midlands-based universities—Aston University, the University of Birmingham, the University of Leicester, Loughborough University and the University of Nottingham—formed the M5 Group, a regional bloc intended to maximise the member institutions' research income and enable closer collaboration.

In September 2013 it was announced that a new National Automotive Innovation Centre would be built by WMG at Warwick's main campus at a cost of £100 million, with £50 million to be contributed by Jaguar Land Rover and £30 million by Tata Motors. The centre will open in Summer 2018.

In July 2014, the government announced that Warwick would be the host for the £1 billion Advanced Propulsion Centre, a joint venture between the Automotive Council and industry. The ten-year programme intends to position the university and the UK as leaders in the field of research into the next generation of automotive technology.

In September 2015, Warwick celebrated its 50th anniversary (1965–2015) and was designated "University of the Year" by The Times and The Sunday Times.

In December 2017 the university announced it would not continue with a project to open a Campus in Roseville, California. The university had spent £1.2M on the project.

Campus
The university's main site comprises three contiguous campuses, all within walking distance of each other. The university also owns a site in Wellesbourne, acquired in 2004 when it merged with Horticulture Research International.

Main campus
The main Warwick campus occupies  between the City of Coventry and the County of Warwickshire. The original buildings of the campus are in contemporary 1960s architecture. The campus contains all of the main student amenities, all but four of the student halls of residence, and the Students' Union. The campus is split between the parliamentary constituencies of Kenilworth and Southam and Coventry South.

Warwick Arts Centre 

The Warwick Arts Centre is a multi-venue arts complex situated at the centre of Warwick's main campus. It attracts around 300,000 visitors a year to over 3,000 individual events spanning contemporary and classical music, drama, dance, comedy, films and visual art. The centre comprises six principal spaces: the Butterworth Hall, a 1,500-seat concert hall; a 550-seat theatre; a 180-seat theatre studio; a 220-seat cinema; the Mead Gallery, an art gallery; and the Music Centre, with practice rooms, and an ensemble rehearsal room where music societies and groups can rehearse. In addition the site includes the university bookshop, hospitality suites, a restaurant, cafe, shops, and two bars.

University House
In 2003 Warwick acquired the former headquarters of National Grid, which it converted into an administration building renamed University House.  There is a student-run facility called the ‘Learning Grid’ in the building, which includes two floors of PC clusters, scanners, photocopiers, a reference library, interactive whiteboards and plasma screens for use by individuals and for group work.

Koan

The White Koan is a modern art sculpture by Liliane Lijn which is installed outside the main entrance to the Warwick Arts Centre. It is intended to represent the Buddhist quest for questions without answers, the Kōan. The Koan was made in 1971 as part of the Peter Stuyvesant Foundation City Sculpture Project and was originally sited in Plymouth; it moved to the Hayward Gallery in London before being purchased by Warwick in 1972. The Koan was temporarily relocated to the university's Gibbet Hill campus during refurbishments to the Warwick Arts Centre; it was returned upon completion of the project. According to student newspaper The Boar, the white Koan has played a role in many of campus' myths and legends – it was allegedly the nose-cap of the Blue-Streak Missile (a failed Apollo mission), a supposed quick escape route for senior staff, and even a signalling device for aliens in outer space.
The Koan even garnered its very own cartoon strip in the 90s, with 32 episodes created by Steve Shipway.
The Koan Worshipping Society, led by the Koanists, believe the Koan is “the earth-bound manifestation of the immortal Koan, the creator of the universe”.

Sports facilities
In April 2019 the university opened a new £49 million Sports and Wellness Hub, on the main campus, featuring two sports halls with arena style balcony, the largest gym in the Higher education sector, a 12-lane 25 m pool with movable floor, climbing and bouldering walls, squash courts, studio spaces and a café.

Warwick was an official training venue for the London 2012 Olympics. During the Games, some football matches were played at the nearby Ricoh Arena, home at the time to Coventry City Football Club, and Warwick provided training and residential facilities for the Olympic teams.

Esports Facilities
In September 2021, Warwick opened its esports centre in the new Junction building (the old sports centre building) on central campus, marking it as the first esports facility opened in a Russell Group university and also the first university esports facility to be opened in the UK that is not tied to a degree/syllabus. The centre is equipped with 24 pcs, and is designed to be easily configurable and moveable to facilitate the hosting of larger scale events. The centre is open to all of the public, not just students of the university, and this is all only part of "phase 1" of a larger push from the university to invest in esports. The centre is sponsored by Uninn and Coventry City Football Club, partnered with Sky Blues in the Community, Women in Games and Special Effect and has its tech supplied by Chillblast and HyperX.

Other sites

Other Warwick sites include:
 The Gibbet Hill Campus, located contiguous to the main campus; home to the department of Life Sciences and the pre-clinical activities of Warwick Medical School.
 The Westwood Campus, located contiguous to the main campus; home to the Centre for Professional Education, Centre for Lifelong Learning, the Arden House conference centre, an indoor tennis centre, a running track and some postgraduate facilities and student residences.
 The University of Warwick Science Park.
 University Hospital Coventry, in Walsgrave on Sowe area and home to the Clinical Sciences Building of the medical school.
 Warwick Horticulture Research International Research & Conference Centre, located in Wellesbourne, Warwickshire.
 The Shard skyscraper, in the city of London, houses Warwick Business School's metropolitan campus where the Executive MBA is taught.

Planned developments

In November 2005, Warwick announced its vision for the year 2020 and outlined proposals for how it would like to develop its campus over the next 15 years. The proposals built upon recent construction activity including a new Mathematics and Statistics Building, a new Computer Science Building, new Business School buildings, the Digital Laboratory, the new Heronbank Residences and an expanded Sports Centre. The proposals envisage a shift in the "centre of gravity" of the campus away from the Students' Union towards University House and a proposed "Academic Square" located around the new maths and computer science buildings.

Forthcoming projects include an inter-disciplinary biosciences research facility; a £25 million upgrade to Warwick Business School; and the National Automotive Innovation Campus, a new £150 million venture funded by Jaguar Land Rover and the UK government. The NAIC's purpose is to research and develop novel technologies to reduce dependency on fossil fuels and to reduce  emissions. The new  campus will provide research opportunities for postgraduates from 2016 onwards. The campus has been dubbed a ‘brain trust’ and will be used to pioneer the green and high-tech sports and luxury cars of tomorrow, doubling the size of Jaguar's research team.

Later in 2017, the university released its 2030 vision which will see an exponential growth of its main campus in order to remain "world-class" and cope with the growing number of applications it receives each year, especially from non-UK students (41% of the student population). This growth will include a new £33 million Faculty of Arts, a £55 million new sports centre (finished in April 2019), a new £54.3 million Interdisciplinary Biomedical Research Building (IBRB), a new type of student accommodation called "Cryfield village", the expansion of Warwick Manufacturing Group (WMG), a redevelopment for the Art centre and a new Library (scheduled in 5 years time). For this occasion, Stuart Croft, vice chancellor of the university declared "New buildings are and will continue to be a part of our everyday existence. We need to open one new academic building a year from now until at least 2023. In order to do this and to keep Warwick as one of the world’s leading universities, we need to do this together, involving the whole community."

Organisation and administration

Warwick is governed by two formal bodies: the Council and the Senate. In addition to these, a steering committee provide strategic leadership in between meetings of the formal bodies. Faculties are overseen by Faculty Boards which report to the Senate.

The Principal Officers of the university have responsibility for day-to-day operations of the university. These include The Registrar, The Secretary to Council, The Group Finance Director, The Director of Commercial, The Chief Information and Digital Officer, and the Chief Communications Officer The latter two roles were created after it emerged that the current Registrar, Rachel Sandby-Thomas, had failed in her duty as the then Data Protection Officer to notify staff, students, and partners of a series of significant breaches.

Faculties and departments
Warwick's academic activities are organised into the following faculties and departments:

Finances 
In the financial year ended 31 July 2019, Warwick had a total income, including share of joint ventures, of £688.6 million (2017/18: £631.5 million). Key sources of income included £344.5 million from academic fees and support grants (2017/18: £316.6 million), £137.8 million from research grants and contracts (2017/18: £126.5 million), and £136.9 million from operating incomes (2017/18: £123.0 million). At year-end Warwick had endowment assets of £12 million (2017/18: £11.5 million).

Coat of arms 
Warwick's coat of arms depicts atoms of two isotopes of lithium, a DNA helix to represent science and also the Bear and Ragged Staff, historically associated with Warwickshire (and previously the Earls of Warwick) and the Elephant and Castle of Coventry. The bear is not chained in the current depiction of the university's coat of arms, although it had been in its original grant of Letters Patent by the College of Arms.
Note:
The Elephant and Castle in the first quarter is for Coventry and the Bear and Ragged Staff in the fourth for Warwickshire.

Crest
On a Wreath of the Colours, the Mantling Gules, doubled Or, an Open Book bound and clasped Argent, the pages
Or, inscribed thereon in Roman Capitals Sable MENS AGITAT MOLEM, and resting on a book fesswise Argent, the fore edge to the front Or.

Academic profile
In October 2018, Warwick had 26,531 students, with around two-fifths being postgraduates. About 43% of the student body comes from outside the UK and over 120 countries are represented on the campus. The university has 29 academic departments and over 40 research centres and institutes, in three faculties: Arts, Science Technology Engineering and Mathematics (STEM), and Social Sciences. There were 2,492 academic and research staff in October 2018.

International partnerships
Warwick students can study abroad for a semester or a year and may obtain a double degree (degrees awarded by both partners). International partners include Columbia University, McGill University, Cornell University, UC Berkeley, Sciences Po Paris, and the Balsillie School of International Affairs.

Rankings and reputation

Warwick has a number of subjects within the 2018 ARWU's global top 50:
 10th in Mathematics 
 20th in Management 
 24th in Statistics 
 28th in Economics 
 33rd in Political Sciences 
In broad subject rankings, Warwick is ranked 36th globally for Social Sciences, 42nd for Humanities, and 78th for Natural Sciences, 164 for Engineering and Technology, and 204 for Life Sciences and Medicine according to the 2020 QS World University Rankings. In subject rankings, Warwick has a number of subjects within the global top 50 including:  
 16th in Statistics
 19th in Mathematics
 23rd in English and Literature
 23rd in Business and Management
 25th in Economics and Econometrics
 38th in Philosophy
 39th in History
 42nd in Modern Languages
 47th in Accounting and Finance
 48th in Sociology
 48th in Development Studies
 49th in Politics and International Studies

Warwick's Economics department and Politics and International Studies (PAIS) department were ranked 1st in the UK by the Good University Guide 2020 ahead of Oxbridge. The Mathematics department was ranked 10th in the world (3rd in the UK) in 2019 by Academic Ranking of World Universities and 19th in the world (4th in the UK) in 2020 by QS. The Guardian University Guide ranks Warwick Business School (WBS) second only after Oxford's Saïd Business School Business and Management in 2014. The 2020 QS World University Rankings ranked WBS 4th in the UK and 23rd globally. However, Law and Legal Studies at Warwick has dropped from 36th globally in 2013 to 51–100th in 2020.

The Times Higher Education rankings has ranked 6 out of 11 subjects (not including teaching rankings) at Warwick within the global top 100 in 2020.

 4th in Teaching Rankings
 26th in Economics and Business
 51st in Arts and Humanities
 64th in Law
 81st in Physical Sciences
 81st in Social Sciences
 85th in Psychology

Warwick is consistently ranked amongst the top ten in the three major national rankings of British universities. Warwick is a member of the 'Sutton 13' of top ranked universities in the UK. Warwick was declared as The Times and The Sunday Times University of the Year 2015.

Overall, 19 of the 27 subjects offered by Warwick were ranked within the top 10 nationally in 2019 by the Complete University Guide.

In 2017, Warwick was named as the university with the joint second highest graduate employment rate of any UK university (along with St Andrews), with 97.7 per cent of its graduates in work or further study three and a half years after graduation.

Admissions

Warwick students also average top A-Level grades with new entrants in 2015 amassing an average of 478 UCAS points, the equivalent of AAAaa at A-level—the 13th highest in the country. In 2015, the university had the 6th highest offer rate amongst the Russell Group. For 2017 entry, the university was one of only a few mainstream universities (along with Cambridge, Imperial College, LSE, Oxford, St Andrews, and UCL) to have no courses available in Clearing.

22% of Warwick's undergraduates are privately educated, the fifteenth highest proportion amongst mainstream British universities. In the 2016–17 academic year, the university had a domicile breakdown of 66:9:25 of UK:EU:non-EU students respectively with a female to male ratio of 50:50.

Library
The main university library is located in the middle of the main campus. It houses approximately 1,265,000 books and over 13 km of archives and manuscripts. The main library houses services to support Research and Teaching practice and collaboration between departments. The Wolfson Research Exchange opened in October 2008 and provides collaboration spaces (both physical and virtual), seminar rooms, conference facilities and study areas for Postgraduate Research students. The Teaching Grid, which opened in 2008, is a flexible space which allows teaching staff to try out new technologies and techniques. Adjacent to the main library building is the Modern Records Centre, a sizeable archive collection, including the UK's largest industrial relations collection.

Awards

In 2008 the university launched a new prize, the Warwick Prize for Writing, worth £50,000. It is defined as "an international cross-disciplinary award which will be given biennially for an excellent and substantial piece of writing in the English language, in any genre or form, on a theme that will change with every award". The inaugural winner of the award was Naomi Klein for her critically acclaimed book Shock Doctrine.

Research
In 2013/14 Warwick had a total research income of £90.1 million, of which £33.9 million was from Research Councils; £25.9 million was from central government, local authorities and public corporations; £12.7 million was from the European Union; £7.9 million was from UK industry and commerce; £5.2 million was from UK charitable bodies; £4.0 million was from overseas sources; and £0.5 million was from other sources.

In the 2014 UK Research Excellence Framework (REF), Warwick was again ranked 7th overall (as 2008) amongst multi-faculty institutions and was the top-ranked university in the Midlands. Some 87% of the university's academic staff were rated as being in "world-leading" or "internationally excellent" departments with top research ratings of 4* or 3*.

Warwick is particularly strong in the areas of decision sciences research (economics, finance, management, mathematics and statistics). For instance, researchers of the Warwick Business School have won the highest prize of the prestigious European Case Clearing House (ECCH: the equivalent of the Oscars in terms of management research).

Warwick has established a number of stand-alone units to manage and extract commercial value from its research activities. The four most prominent examples of these units are University of Warwick Science Park; Warwick HRI; Warwick Ventures (the technology transfer arm of the university); and WMG.

Commercial focus
Warwick has at times received criticism for being too commercially focused, at the expense of academic creativity and diversity. The most famous proponent of this critique was the noted historian E.P. Thompson, who edited and wrote much of  Warwick University Ltd in 1971. The book focuses on the brief student occupation of the Registry in 1967, and its causes, the files that were discovered and published, and the subsequent actions of the university, students and staff.

Nevertheless, with the appointment of Sir Nicholas Scheele as Chancellor in 2002, the university signalled that it intended to continue and expand its commercial activities. In an interview for the BBC, Scheele said: "I think in the future, education and industry need to become even more closely linked than they have been historically. As government funding changes, the replacement could well come through private funding from companies, individuals and grant-giving agencies."

Student life

Undergraduate student life at Warwick can be broadly divided into two phases. In the first year, student life revolves around campus and, in particular, the Students' Union (with its sports clubs, societies, and entertainment facilities). In subsequent years students typically live off-campus, in Leamington Spa, and more rarely in either the Coventry suburbs of Earlsdon and Canley or the town of Kenilworth.

Students' Union

The University of Warwick Students' Union is one of the largest students' unions in the UK, and currently has over 260 societies and 67 sports clubs including basketball, rowing and ice hockey. The Union has an annual turnover of approximately £6 million, the profit from which is used to provide services to students and to employ its staff and sabbatical officers.

The Union is divided into two buildings—SUHQ (mainly societies and administration and Restaurant Canopy) and The Union Building (entertainment facilities). The Union Building contains a three-room club venue known as "The Copper Rooms"; CAMRA-accredited "The Dirty Duck" pub; a popular bar called "The Terrace Bar"; Curiositea, a tea shop famous for its hot chocolates, cakes and vintage atmosphere; The Graduate, a postgraduate social and study space; and The Bread Oven, a design-your-own sandwich shop.

The Union is a member of the National Union of Students (NUS) and National Postgraduate Committee (NPC).

Student media
Student media at Warwick includes:
 Radio Warwick (RAW) – student radio station
 The Boar – newspaper distributed free across campus every second Wednesday
 ‘Perspectives’ – The Warwick Politics Society's termly print magazine, radio show and online magazine

University Challenge
The university is the current title-holder (2021) of BBC television's University Challenge competition. This was their second win – their first was in 2007, beating the title-holders University of Manchester in the final.

Esports
The University of Warwick are the four-time UK Esports University of the Year, having won the title every year since its inception. In August 2022, Warwick became the first UK university to receive a finalist nomination for the Esports Awards, for Esports Collegiate Program of the Year, with Head of Esports Jack Fenton also becoming the first UK nominee for Collegiate Ambassador of the Year.  Warwick fields numerous esports teams each year through its student-run esports society, Warwick Esports, who compete out of the Esports Centre.

Student housing

The Warwick campus currently has around 6,300 student bedrooms across a range of undergraduate and postgraduate residences. All of the residences are self-catered, and each has residential tutors and a warden. Warwick guarantees accommodation for all first-year undergraduate students, regardless of their present address. Many of the university's postgraduate population are also catered for, with some specific residences available for postgraduate living. Each residence accommodates a mixture of students both domestic and foreign, male and female, and, sometimes, undergraduate and postgraduate.

In their second and third years, many students live in one of the surrounding towns: either Coventry, Canley, Kenilworth or Royal Leamington Spa, where they can live in university-managed accommodation or independently owned residences.

Since 2011, Warwick has constructed two new halls of residences for the students. Bluebell, opened in 2011, offers accommodation in flats of 8 people, with a total of 505 single rooms for first-year undergraduates. The Sherbourne residences was opened in 2012, which similarly provides 527 ensuite rooms to first-years, and was extended with a further 267 rooms in 2017. A further 700 new rooms were built in the Cryfield Village, named the Cryfield Townhouse residences.

Political incidents 
In June 2014 the university announced Alex Davies, a member of the proscribed terrorist organisation National Action, voluntarily withdrew from his course.

In early 2018, it was made public that a group of male students had constituted a group chat in which many references to rape, occasionally targeted at particular other students, and other sexual offences were made, in such a way which left significant cause for concern.

In January 2020 the university was criticised for choosing not to adopt the IHRA definition of antisemitism. This decision was later reversed in October following intervention by Education Secretary Gavin Williamson.

Notable people

Warwick has over 150,000 alumni and an active alumni network. Among the university's alumni, academic staff and researchers are two Nobel Laureates, a Turing Award winner, and a significant number of fellows of the British Academy, the Royal Society of Literature, the Royal Academy of Engineering, and the Royal Society.

Former Warwick students active in politics and government include Guðni Th. Jóhannesson, President of Iceland; Luis Arce, President of Bolivia; Joseph Ngute, Prime Minister of Cameroon; Yakubu Gowon, former President of Nigeria; Sir Gus O'Donnell, former Cabinet Secretary and head of the British Civil Service; Andrew Haldane, Chief Economist at the Bank of England; David Davis, former Secretary of State for Exiting the European Union and former Shadow Home Secretary; Baroness Valerie Amos, the eighth UN Under-Secretary-General for Humanitarian Affairs and Emergency Relief Coordinator and former Leader of the House of Lords; Mahmoud Mohieldin the Senior Vice President of the World Bank Group; Bob Kerslake, former Head of the Home Civil Service; Kim Howells, former Foreign Office Minister; and Isabel Carvalhais, Portuguese MEP (S&D Group); H.A Hellyer, led the British government's Taskforce on Tackling Radicalisation and Extremism; George Chouliarakis, Greek Alternate Minister of Finance; and Sir Bob Kerslake, Head of the Home Civil Service.

In academia, people associated with Warwick include: Nobel Prize in Chemistry (1975) winner Sir John Cornforth who was a professor at Warwick; mathematicians Ian Stewart, David Preiss, David Epstein and Fields Medallist Martin Hairer; computer scientists Mike Cowlishaw and Leslie Valiant; and neurologist Oliver Sacks. In arts and the social sciences: Nobel Laureate Oliver Hart; economist and President of the British Academy Nicholas Stern, Baron Stern of Brentford; academic and Provost of Worcester College Sir Jonathan Bate; academic and journalist Germaine Greer; literary critic Susan Bassnett; historians Sir J. R. Hale and David Arnold;  economist Andrew Oswald; economic historian Robert Skidelsky, Baron Skidelsky; Lady Margaret Archer, theorist in critical realism, former Warwick lecturer and accelerationist philosopher Nick Land, former President of International Sociological Association, current president of Pontifical Academy of Social Sciences; Sir George Bain, former Principal of London Business School; John Williamson, English economist who coined the term Washington Consensus; Susan Strange, British scholar of international relations who was almost single-handedly responsible for creating international political economy; Avinash Dixit, former President of the Econometric Society and American Economic Association, elected to the American Academy of Arts and Sciences in 1992 and the National Academy of Sciences in 2005; Robert Calderbank, winner of the IEEE Richard W. Hamming Medal and the Claude E. Shannon Award; and Upendra Baxi, winner of the Padma Shri award.

Warwick graduates are active in business. In the automotive industry, this includes Linda Jackson, CEO of Citroën; Andy Palmer, CEO of Aston Martin; Ralf Speth, CEO of Jaguar Land Rover; Sudarshan Venu, MD of TVS Motor Company; Others include Bernardo Hees, former CEO of both the Heinz Company and of Burger King; Nigel Wilson, CEO of Legal & General; and Ian Gorham, CEO of Hargreaves Lansdown; Ness Wadia.

Notable Warwick alumni in media, entertainment and the arts include Emmy and BAFTA Award-winning Stephen Merchant, best known for being the co-writer and co-director of the sitcoms The Office and Extras; Oscar-nominated screenwriter Tony Roche, known for co-writing and co-producing Veep and The Thick of It; Olivier Award-winning director and writer Dominic Cooke, who is also artistic director at the Royal Court Theatre; actress Ruth Jones; comedian and actor Frank Skinner; Guardian columnist Dawn Foster; blacksmith turned comedian and comedy writer Lloyd Langford; actors Matt Stokoe and Adam Buxton; science fiction and fantasy author Jonathan Green; actor Julian Rhind-Tutt; Olivier Award-winning actor, Alex Jennings; author Anne Fine; author A.L. Kennedy; Tony Wheeler, creator of the Lonely Planet travel guides; Camila Batmanghelidjh; Merfyn Jones, governor of the BBC; and electronic dance music artist Gareth Emery. Grammy- and Emmy Award-winning musician Sting enrolled at Warwick, but left after a term.

See also
Armorial of UK universities
List of universities in the United Kingdom
Plate glass university

References

External links

 
1965 establishments in England
Educational institutions established in 1965
Buildings and structures in Coventry
Russell Group
Universities UK